Edgeryders is a social enterprise, and an open and distributed think tank of people working through an online social network and a series of conferences. 

Edgeryders started out as a project of the Council of Europe and the European Commission in 2011  and evolved into a volunteer-driven online/offline community by 2013.

Today, there is also the not-for-profit company Edgeryders, living in symbiosis with the online community. As a company, Edgeryders works with communities on funded research, development and social innovation projects in a model they call "open consulting".

Among the most visible of Edgeryders' projects is the unMonastery which began with a pilot in Matera, Italy as well as the Science Fiction Economics Lab and OpenCare.

External links
 Edgeryders community website
 Edgeryders - Council of Europe project website
 The Edgeryders Guide to the Future

References

Estonian social networking websites